Michael Matteucci (born December 27, 1971) is a Canadian former professional ice hockey defenceman. He played 6 games in the National Hockey League with the Minnesota Wild between 2000 and 2002.

Playing career
Matteucci played four seasons of collegiate hockey at Lake Superior State University from 1992–93 to 1995–96, and was a member of the Lakers' championship team in 1994.

Undrafted after college, Matteucci played for the Long Beach Ice Dogs of the International Hockey League from 1996 to 2000. With the Ice Dogs, he became a fan favorite as an enforcer. In his four-plus seasons with the Ice Dogs, Matteucci racked up more than 900 penalty minutes.

Following his time with the Ice Dogs, Matteucci signed with the Minnesota Wild. He played 6 NHL games for the Wild in the 2000–01 and 2001–02 seasons. He spent most of the 2000–01 season with the IHL Cleveland Lumberjacks, and most of 2001–02 with the AHL Houston Aeros, where he served as team captain.

Matteucci signed a free agent contract with the New Jersey Devils in 2002, and spent the next two seasons as captain of the Albany River Rats, New Jersey's AHL affiliate. He then moved on to the Milwaukee Admirals.

Matteucci announced his retirement from the Admirals on December 4, 2004.

Post-playing career
In 2014, Matteucci was inducted into the Lake Superior State Athletic Hall of Fame, along with his 1994 championship team.

He currently lives with his wife, and two children in Traverse City, Michigan. Matteucci coaches for the Bay Reps and Traverse City North Stars. Matteucci is also a detective with the Grand Traverse County Sheriff's Department.

Career statistics

Regular season and playoffs

External links
 
 Mike Matteucci at DropYourGloves.com

1971 births
Living people
Albany River Rats players
Canadian ice hockey defencemen
Cleveland Lumberjacks players
Houston Aeros (1994–2013) players
Ice hockey people from British Columbia
Lake Superior State Lakers men's ice hockey players
Long Beach Ice Dogs (IHL) players
Los Angeles Ice Dogs players
Milwaukee Admirals players
Minnesota Wild players
NCAA men's ice hockey national champions
San Jose Rhinos players
Sportspeople from Trail, British Columbia
Sportspeople from Traverse City, Michigan
Undrafted National Hockey League players